When Dinosaurs Roamed America (sometimes shortened to When Dinosaurs Roamed outside of the U.S.) is a two-hour American television program (produced in the style of a traditional nature documentary) that first aired on the Discovery Channel on July 15, 2001. The show features the reign of the non-avian dinosaurs in America over the course of more than 160 million years, through five different segments, each with their own variety of flora and fauna.

When Dinosaurs Roamed America premiered to 5 million viewers and aired numerous times on the Discovery HD Theater's opening lineup in 2002. It was released on VHS and DVD in August 2001, and had a number of re-releases on DVD since then. When Dinosaurs Roamed America also had a limited Region 2 release on Blu-ray in 2011, bundled with Valley of the T. rex.

Production
When Dinosaurs Roamed America was directed by Pierre de Lespinois with Evergreen Films, and was narrated by actor John Goodman (voice of Rex in We're Back! A Dinosaur Story and Fred Flintstone from the 1994 film). The featured dinosaurs were designed by paleoartist and art director Mark Dubeau, noted for creating dinosaurs for many other Discovery Channel and National Geographic specials. The dinosaur animation was accomplished by animator Don Waller at Meteor Studios, in Montreal, Canada, while the music was composed by Christopher Franke (ex-member from Tangerine Dream). Unlike Walking with Dinosaurs, the show's creatures are almost entirely composed of computer-generated imagery, and is also one of the first documentaries to depict dromaeosaurs and therizinosaurs with nearly full coats of feathers.

The program was shot in high definition for better portability and quality. Exotic HD cameras were rare at the time, which made reaching some of the filming locations for When Dinosaurs Roamed America (which include various parts of Argentina, Tasmania, and Florida) difficult, however, the portable HD cameras allowed de Lespinois and his small team to capture never-before-seen shots of the various landscapes. The show was edited using an offline system rather than online. Animation was done using Final Cut Pro over the course of six months.

Marketing
When Dinosaurs Roamed America was first revealed on the Discovery website in June 2001, originally with a July 13 airdate set. It was also announced that clips from the program would be added to the website for the upcoming show. Nine different clips were available, which showed bits of the five segments of When Dinosaurs Roamed America. The site for When Dinosaurs Roamed America lasted until September 2008, when it became a redirect to the main Dinosaurs page on the Discovery website.

Synopsis

Late Triassic segment (220 million years ago)
The program starts in the Late Triassic, near modern-day New York City in the Newark Supergroup. The narrator explains how the Permian mass extinction led to new forms of life, including, eventually, the most extraordinary creatures ever to walk the planet, the dinosaurs. The camera tracks a Coelophysis through the woods. The program depicts Coelophysis as preying mainly on small animals, such as insects and Icarosaurus. It encounters other, larger non-dinosaurian archosaurs such as Rutiodon and Desmatosuchus. The quick Coelophysis is portrayed as a very successful inhabitant of this world.

Early Jurassic segment (200 million years ago)
The program moves on to the Early Jurassic of Pennsylvania, showing a pack of Syntarsus. These dinosaurs are closely related to Coelophysis. They are hunting the primitive herbivorous dinosaur Anchisaurus; only to be chased away by a Dilophosaurus, which kills the Anchisaurus to feed its young. The narrator then explains Syntarsus  and Dilophosaurus will become the gigantic carnivores such as Allosaurus and Tyrannosaurus, while Anchisaurus will become the sauropods.

Late Jurassic segment (150 million years ago)
The show skips to prehistoric Utah during the Late Jurassic period. The region has been engulfed by a severe drought as the seasonal rain has failed to arrive. A predatory Ceratosaurus stalks a family of Dryosaurus, including a mother and two youngsters. The predator eventually breaks its cover and charges after the small dinosaurs as they scatter. The Dryosaurus can only flee but the Ceratosaurus is quicker than they are and catches up, grabbing and killing one of the juveniles. The Ceratosaurus feasts while the others escape into a grove of pine trees and run into a herd of sauropods called Camarasaurus. They will be safe around the gentle giants. A male Stegosaurus fights off the attacking Ceratosaurus, the same individual from the earlier sequence, later on using his spiked tail and follows a female Stegosaurus by constantly displaying his plates. Eventually, the female decides that he is a healthy individual and the two mate. With the onset of the rainy season, a herd of Apatosaurus arrive, followed by a hungry Allosaurus who launches an assault against the herd while the sauropods graze but is unsuccessful due to their size and strength. The Allosaurus subsequently kills the Ceratosaurus that attacked the Dryosaurus and finally is able to feed. Later while on the move, one Apatosaurus tumbles off of a 20 foot high cliff. The sauropod is injured with a broken leg, and its agonized bellowing is picked up by a trio pack of Allosaurus, which proceed to hunt the sauropod.

Mid Cretaceous segment (90 million years ago)
The program then shows a forest located in New Mexico during the Middle Cretaceous period. Small predatory coelurosaurs scamper through the foliage and steal pieces of meat from a dead Zuniceratops. This smaller cousin of Triceratops had been killed by a pack of raptors and the hungry dinosaurs are feasting. The raptors chase off a lone dromaeosaur as it tries to steal some meat. The lone dromaeosaur tries to attack a grazing Nothronychus, only to be slashed by its long claws and knocked over. Uninjured, the raptor retreats. The old dominant male Zuniceratops is battling for mating rights with a younger but healthier male whilst the herd members look on. The younger dinosaur gores the older herd leader with its right horn, wounding its frill. The sounds of battle are picked up by raptors and the hungry creatures follow the sounds to a clearing and watch from the foliage as the battle plays out before attacking.

The injured Zuniceratops is attacked by the pack of dromaeosaurs and is fatally wounded. Another Zuniceratops headbutts the attacking dromaeosaur and tosses it off the struggling male. The dromaeosaurs retreat but the old Zuniceratops will not last long. Weeks later, a thunderstorm blows in and lightning illuminates the darkened skies. Panicked dinosaurs scatter but the old Zuniceratops cannot get up. As it sounds its distress call, the dromaeosaurs return joined by a fourth member and surround the wounded dinosaur. The raptors attack and soon kill it. Meanwhile, lightning ignites the dry vegetation. Fire springs up, and most of the dinosaurs scatter in all directions. Zuniceratops panic for safety and the Nothronychus follows. However, the feasting dromaeosaurs are too distracted by eating and fire surrounds the region. The four raptors burn to death along with their prey. But some raptors do flee and make it to safety along with some of the other creatures.

Late Cretaceous segment (65 million years ago)
The program explains that dinosaurs similar to Zuniceratops evolved into the famous Triceratops. In the Late Cretaceous near Mount Rushmore in South Dakota, Anatotitan and Triceratops browse on a rolling grassland bordered by tropical jungle, while Ornithomimus peck at roots and other plants in the area. Flying pterosaurs such as Quetzalcoatlus soar overhead, looking for carcasses. A young Tyrannosaurus rex arrives on the scene, and the Triceratops form a defensive circle around the juveniles and display their powerful horns whilst the Tyrannosaurus attempts to get through and roars repeatedly but the Triceratops stay to fight instead of fleeing. Unable to get past the horns of the defensive Triceratops, the Tyrannosaurus attacks a Quetzalcoatlus, but the pterosaur launches off and flies away from the hungry theropod. The Tyrannosaurus goes back into the trees and the Triceratops become less agitated.

At night, the young Tyrannosaurus returns to its family, and the mother Tyrannosaurus chastises two of her young after they hit her scarred leg while sparring. The next day, the young Tyrannosaurus and its siblings are taught by their mother to hunt. They target a herd of Anatotitan grazing in a forest clearing and after bursting from the trees, the herd scatters and flees. The three Tyrannosaurus chase after one individual and it runs straight into the forest where the mother emerges from the bushes, grabs the unfortunate hadrosaur, and kills it by breaking its neck. She then roars before the feast begins.

As they begin to feast, a huge asteroid, 6 miles across, hurtles towards the planet at 45000 miles an hour and as it enters the atmosphere friction turns it into a blazing missile. The asteroid crosses the ocean in just 4 minutes, crashing into the Gulf of Mexico. The impact gouges out a crater 120 miles wide and sends an incandescent plume of dust, glass and ash into the atmosphere which falls back to earth as fiery debris. The blast wave radiates outward from the impact in a circle and in minutes, everything for hundreds of miles is incinerated by the intense heat or blown apart by the blast wave. Dinosaurs in the region are vaporized in a matter of minutes.

In North America, plants and animals suffer a different fate. Some are incinerated by the mounting heat whilst others succumb to shock waves generated by the collision. Fleeing Triceratops and Anatotitan are caught by the speeding ejecta cloud and destroyed. The feasting Tyrannosaurus watch in horror as a burning blast wave hurtles towards them and flee as pieces of fiery rock rain down. Eventually, all the region's dinosaurs die, including the Tyrannosaurus family. A few hours after impact, a heavy cloud of dust and ash settles over America, and temperatures drop as sunlight and heat can no longer reach the surface of the planet. Gasses such as nitrogen and carbon dioxide are burned by the heat and are washed out of the atmosphere as acid rain.

Two months after impact, the sun finally reaches the surface as the heavy cloud of ash clears away. The disaster is over, but 90% of all leaf-bearing trees, ferns, vines and plants have been obliterated, and 70% of the animals have vanished. Most of the dinosaurs are now extinct.

Despite the depressing and traumatic event, life is described as being resilient, and a turtle is shown emerging from the water and a bird flies overhead, explained by the narrator as the only dinosaurs left. Out of the ashes and charred debris, several small possum-like mammals emerge, and the narrator explains that small mammals such as these will eventually evolve into humans, "and think back in awe to a time... when dinosaurs roamed america".

Reception
Tom Shales of The Washington Post wrote that When Dinosaurs Roamed America was 'hugely entertaining'.

Awards and nominations
Primetime Emmy Award
2002 - Outstanding Sound Editing for Non-Fiction Programming (Single or Multi-Camera) Michael Payne, David Esparza, Nancy Nugent and Jonathan Wareham (Won)
2002 - Outstanding Outstanding Animated Program (For Programming One Hour or More) Pierre de Lespinois, Fran Lo Cascio, Tomi Bednar Landis, John Copeland, Georgann Kane, and Don Waller (Nominated)

Notes

References

External links
 
 When Dinosaurs Roamed America from Youtube

2001 television films
2001 films
2001 documentary films
American documentary television films
Discovery Channel original programming
Documentary films about dinosaurs
Films scored by Christopher Franke
2000s American films